Thiotaurine is a bioactive analog of taurine. It is used as a moisturizer and antioxidant in some cosmetic products.

Preparation 
Thiotaurine is made by transsulfuration of thiocysteine and hypotaurine.

References

Amino acids